Kusakari (written: 草刈) is a Japanese surname. Notable people with the surname include:

, Japanese actor and model
, Japanese ballet dancer and actress

Japanese-language surnames